The 2006–07 season was the 76th season in the history of CA Osasuna and the club's seventh consecutive season in the top flight of Spanish football. In addition to the domestic league, Osasuna participated in this season's edition of the Copa del Rey.

Players

First-team squad

Competitions

Overall record

La Liga

League table

Results summary

Results by round

Matches

Copa del Rey

Round of 32

Round of 16

Quarter-finals

Statistics

References

CA Osasuna seasons
Osasuna